Paralomis histrix is a species of king crab, family Lithodidae. It has few predators because of its size and spiky carapace. It is sometimes kept in public aquariums and is occasionally referred to as the porcupine crab, a name otherwise used for Neolithodes grimaldii.

References

External links

King crabs
Crustaceans of Japan
Crustaceans of the Pacific Ocean
Crustaceans described in 1849
Taxa named by Wilhem de Haan